The dwarf Lake Turkana robber (Brycinus minutus) is a species of fish in the family Alestidae. It is endemic to Lake Turkana in Kenya.

References 

Fish described in 1982
Brycinus
Endemic freshwater fish of Kenya
Fish of Lake Turkana
Taxonomy articles created by Polbot